is a Japanese footballer who plays for Vanraure Hachinohe.

Club statistics
Updated to 23 February 2017.

References

External links

Profile at Kataller Toyama
Profile at Vanraure Hachinohe

1992 births
Living people
Niigata University of Health and Welfare alumni
Association football people from Toyama Prefecture
Japanese footballers
J2 League players
J3 League players
Japan Football League players
Kataller Toyama players
Ococias Kyoto AC players
Vanraure Hachinohe players
Association football midfielders